Who Is Nardo Wick? is the debut studio album by American rapper Nardo Wick. It was released on December 3, 2021, by Flawless Entertainment and RCA Records. The album features guest appearances from Future, Lil Baby, Hit-Boy, G Herbo, Lil Durk, 21 Savage, Lakeyah, and Big30. Serving as the first project he has released, the project finds him working with prominent producers, such as Hit-Boy, Boi-1da, DVLP, Leon Thomas III, Tay Keith, Cubeatz, and Murda Beatz, as well as emerging producers, such as brothers Emkay and Arkay, Onokey, Corbett, Ice Melodies and Z3N, among others. Wick announced the album and its release date on November 28, 2021. The deluxe version, titled Who Is Nardo Wick? 2 was released on July 22, 2022, with additional guest features from the Kid Laroi and Latto.

Singles
Three singles were released prior to the album's release. The lead single, "Shhh", was released on April 23, 2021. The second single, "Who Want Smoke??", which features fellow rappers G Herbo, Lil Durk, and 21 Savage, an official remix of Wick's 2021 single, "Who Want Smoke?", was released on October 8, 2021. The third single, "Me or Sum", which features fellow rappers Future and Lil Baby, was released on November 29, 2021.

Track listing

Sample credits
 "Wickman" contains an interpolation of "Jumpman", written by Drake, Future, and Metro Boomin as performed by the former two and produced by the latter.
 "Dah Dah DahDah" contains an interpolation of "Tom's Diner", written by Suzanne Vega, and a sample of "The Gingerbread Man" song.

Credits and personnel
 Brandon Blatz – assistant engineer (tracks 1, 4, 6, 7, 10, 13–16, 18)
 Curtis "Sircut" Bye – mixing engineer (tracks 1, 4, 6, 7, 10, 13–16, 18)
 Cyrus "Nois" Taghipour – mixing engineer (tracks 1, 4, 6, 7, 10, 13–16, 18)
 Derek Ali – mixing engineer (tracks 1, 4, 6, 7, 10, 13–16, 18)
 Tatsuya Sato – mastering engineer (all tracks)
 Nardo Wick – mixing engineer, recording engineer (tracks 2, 3, 5, 9, 11, 12, 17)
 Liz Robson – recording engineer (track 4)
 David Yungin Kim – mixing engineer (track 8)
 Ben Lidsky – mixing engineer (track 9)
 Max Lord – mixing engineer (track 9)

Charts

Weekly charts

Year-end charts

Certifications

References

2021 debut albums
Albums produced by DVLP
Albums produced by Tay Keith
Albums produced by Hit-Boy
Albums produced by Cubeatz
Albums produced by Murda Beatz